Drayton railway station is a former station in Norfolk, England. Constructed by the Midland and Great Northern Joint Railway in the 1880s, on the line between Melton Constable and Norwich, it was closed to passengers in 1959. It served the settlement of Drayton now on the outskirts of Norwich. The site is now home to an industrial site. Many of the buildings follow the old footings of the platform and other buildings. Several of the railway bridges in this area have been filled in or removed. The footings for the bridge entering Drayton from Norwich is now a house. Its former site is now on Marriott's Way.

References

External links
 Drayton station on navigable 1946 O. S. map

Disused railway stations in Norfolk
Former Midland and Great Northern Joint Railway stations
Railway stations in Great Britain opened in 1882
Railway stations in Great Britain closed in 1959